ishlab Music is a music styling, licensing, recording, and production company based in Brooklyn, New York. Ishlab Music Studio has been a fully operational music studio and music production facility since its founding in 2000 by Jāmin Gilbert. ishlab Music has facilitated work by artists such as: Amel Larrieux, Anthony Hamilton, Girls Against Boys, Lauryn Hill, and ASAP Rocky.

Founder Jāmin Gilbert also does in house recording, mixing, and production of artists including Emanuel and the Fear.

Notes

Music production companies
Entertainment companies of the United States
Companies based in New York City